Nora Sundberg (born 30 September 2005) is a Swedish amateur golfer. She played on the winning Junior Solheim Cup and Junior Vagliano Trophy teams in 2021 and won the 2023 Spanish International Ladies Amateur Championship.

Career
Sundberg grew up in Stockholm and represents Stockholm Golf Club. She played in the European Young Masters in 2019 and 2020, and joined the National Team in 2021. At the European Girls' Team Championship in 2021, her team finished third. In 2022, they finished second, as the final with France ended 4–3, after beating England 6–1 in the semi-final.

In 2021, Sundberg played on the winning Junior Solheim Cup in Toledo, Ohio, captained by Annika Sörenstam, where she won, 3 and 1, over Bailey Shoemaker in her final day match. She was also on the European 2021 Junior Vagliano Trophy team that beat Janet Melville's  British team in the Netherlands 14–4.

Sundberg had individual success on the Swedish Teen Tour and won six tournaments between 2018 and 2021. On her way to win the 2021 Teen Tour Elite #5 at Fullerö Golf Club, she shot a final round 63, a course record. After holding the overnight lead ahead of the final round of the Annika Invitational Europe in 2021, she finished runner-up behind Meja Örtengren. She was again runner-up at the tournament in 2022. She won the 2021 Swedish Teen Tour Order of Merit. 

In 2022, she won the Swedish Junior Strokeplay Championship as one of five titles that year. She made her Ladies European Tour debut at the 2022 Skaftö Open where she finished low amateur, tied for 22nd place.

In  2023, she won the stroke play and all her matches to capture the Spanish International Ladies Amateur Championship, a qualifying event for the Junior Solheim Cup.

Personal life
Her sister Alice played college golf at Campbell University between 2018 and 2022.

Amateur wins
2018 Teen Tour Future #1, Teen Tour Future #2
2019 Ping Salem Junior Open
2021 Teen Tour Elite #5, Teen Tour Elite #6, Teen Tour Final
2022 Swedish Invitational GolfTech Tour #1, RIG&NIU Classic GolfTech Tour #2, Teen Tour Elite #1, Swedish Junior Strokeplay Championship, Teen Tour Elite #5
2023 Spanish International Ladies Amateur Championship

Source:

Team appearances
Amateur
European Young Masters (representing Sweden): 2019, 2020
European Girls' Team Championship (representing Sweden): 2021, 2022
Junior Solheim Cup (representing Europe): 2021 (winners)
Junior Vagliano Trophy (representing the Continent of Europe): 2021 (winners)

Source:

References

External links

Swedish female golfers
Amateur golfers
Golfers from Stockholm
2005 births
Living people